The Tenth International Jean Sibelius Violin Competition took place in Helsinki from November 21 to 2 December 2010. It was won by Russian violinist Nikita Borisoglebsky, while Petteri Iivonen and Esther Yoo earned the 2nd and 3rd prizes.

Jurors
  Jukka-Pekka Saraste (chairman)
  Ik-Hwan Bae
  Olivier Charlier
  Ana Chumachenco 
  Jaakko Kuusisto
  Sung-ju Lee
  Igor Oistrakh
  Arve Tellefsen
  Jari Valo

Results

References

Violin competitions
Jean Sibelius
Music competitions in Finland
2010 in Finland